The women's 3000 metres event  at the 1988 European Athletics Indoor Championships was held on 6 March.

Results

References

3000 metres at the European Athletics Indoor Championships
3000
Euro